The Squeaker may refer to:

 The Squeaker (novel), a novel by Edgar Wallace
 The Squeaker (1930 film), a British film directed by Edgar Wallace
 The Squeaker (1931 film), a German film directed by Martin Frič and Karel Lamač
 The Squeaker (1937 film), a British film directed by William K. Howard
 The Squeaker (1963 film), a West German/French film directed by Alfred Vohrer

See also 
 Squeaker (disambiguation)